Codling is an English surname. Notable people with the surname include:

 Alex Codling (born 1973), English rugby union footballer
 Allan Codling (1911–1991), English footballer
 Danny Codling (born 1979), New Zealand boxer
 Monalisa Codling (born 1977), New Zealand rugby union player
 Neil Codling (born 1973), English musician and songwriter
 Rowland Codling (1880–1954), English footballer

English-language surnames